A gas cylinder is a pressure vessel for storage and containment of gases at above atmospheric pressure. High-pressure gas cylinders are also called bottles. Inside the cylinder the stored contents may be in a state of compressed gas, vapor over liquid, supercritical fluid, or dissolved in a substrate material, depending on the physical characteristics of the contents. A typical gas cylinder design is elongated, standing upright on a flattened bottom end, with the valve and fitting at the top for connecting to the receiving apparatus.

The term cylinder in this context is not to be confused with tank, the latter being an open-top or vented container that stores liquids under gravity, though the term scuba tank is commonly used to refer to a cylinder used for breathing gas supply to an underwater breathing apparatus.

Nomenclature 
In the United States, "bottled gas" typically refers to liquefied petroleum gas. "Bottled gas" is sometimes used in medical supply, especially for portable oxygen tanks. Packaged industrial gases are frequently called "cylinder gas", though "bottled gas" is sometimes used. The term propane tank is also used for cylinders with propane. 

The United Kingdom and other parts of Europe more commonly refer to "bottled gas" when discussing any usage, whether industrial, medical, or liquefied petroleum. In contrast, what is called liquefied petroleum gas in the United States is known generically in the United Kingdom as "LPG" and it may be ordered by using one of several trade names, or specifically as butane or propane, depending on the required heat output.

Materials 

Design codes and application standards and the cost of materials dictated the choice of steel with no welds for most gas cylinders; the steel is treated to resist corrosion. Some newly developed lightweight gas cylinders are made from stainless steel and composite materials. Due to the very high tensile strength of carbon fiber reinforced polymer, these vessels can be very light, but are more difficult to manufacture.

Cylinders reinforced or built-up with a fibre material usually must be inspected more frequently than metal cylinders, e.g., every 5 instead of 10 years, and must be inspected more thoroughly than metal cylinders. They may have a limited service life.

The inspection interval of steel cylinders has increased from 5 or 6 years to 10 years. Diving cylinders that are used in water must be inspected more often. When they were found to have inherent structural problems, certain steel and aluminium alloys have been withdrawn from service.

Fibre composite cylinders were originally specified for a limited life span of 15, 20 or 30 years, while steel cylinders are nowadays typically withdrawn after 70 years, or may continue to be used indefinitely providing they pass periodic inspection and testing. Since some years there exist composite cylinders that are nominated for a non-limited-life (NLL), as long as no damage is to be seen.

Types 
Since glass-fibre-composite materials were used to reinforce cylinders, there are various types of construction of high-pressure vessels:

 Metal only. Mostly seamless forged metal. But for lower working pressure, e.g., liquefied butane, there are welded steel vessels, too.
 Metal vessel, hoop wrapped with a fibre composite only around the cylindrical part of the "cylinder". (Geometrically there is a need for twice the tensile strength on the cylindrical region in comparison to the spherical caps of the cylinder.)
 Thin metal liner (that keeps the vessel tight, but does not contribute to the working pressure)  fully wrapped with fibre in the matrix material.
  Metal-free liner from plastics, fully wrapped with fibre material. The boss, the centre of the head(s) of the cylinder is still from metal and includes the thread for the valve.

Pressure vessels for gas storage may also be classified by volume. In South Africa, a gas storage cylinder implies a refillable transportable container with a water capacity volume of up to 150 litres. Refillable transportable cylindrical containers from 150 to 3,000 litres water capacity are referred to as tubes.

Regulations and testing 
The transportation of high-pressure cylinders is regulated by many governments throughout the world. Various levels of testing are generally required by the governing authority for the country in which it is to be transported. In the United States, this authority is the United States Department of Transportation (DOT). Similarly in the UK, the European transport regulations (ADR) are implemented by the Department for Transport (DfT). For Canada, this authority is Transport Canada (TC). Cylinders may have additional requirements placed on design and or performance from independent testing agencies such as Underwriters Laboratories (UL). Each manufacturer of high-pressure cylinders is required to have an independent quality agent that will inspect the product for quality and safety.

Within the UK the "competent authority" — the Department for Transport (DfT) — implements the regulations and appointment of authorised cylinder testers is conducted by United Kingdom Accreditation Service (UKAS), who make recommendations to the Vehicle Certification Agency (VCA) for approval of individual bodies.

There are a variety of tests that may be performed on various cylinders. Some of the most common types of tests are hydrostatic test, burst test, ultimate tensile strength, Charpy impact test and pressure cycling.

During the manufacturing process, vital information is usually stamped or permanently marked on the cylinder. This information usually includes the type of cylinder, the working or service pressure, the serial number, date of manufacture, the manufacture's registered code and sometimes the test pressure. Other information may also be stamped, depending on the regulation requirements.

High-pressure cylinders that are used multiple times — as most are — can be hydrostatically or ultrasonically tested and visually examined every few years. In the United States, hydrostatic/ultrasonic testing is required either every five years or every ten years, depending on cylinder and its service.

Valve connections

Valve 
Gas cylinders usually have a stop angle valve at one end, and the cylinder is usually oriented so the valve is on top. During storage, transportation, and handling when the gas is not in use, a cap may be screwed over the protruding valve to protect it from damage or breaking off in case the cylinder were to fall over. Instead of a cap, cylinders sometimes have a protective collar or neck ring around the valve assembly.

Connection 
The valves on industrial, medical and diving cylinders usually have threads of different handedness, sizes and types that depend on the category of gas, making it more difficult to mistakenly misuse a gas. For example, a hydrogen cylinder does not fit an oxygen regulator and supply line, which could result in catastrophe. Some fittings use a right-hand thread, while others use a left-hand thread; left-hand thread fittings are usually identifiable by notches or grooves cut into them.

In the United States, valve connections are sometimes referred to as CGA connections, since the Compressed Gas Association (CGA) publishes guidelines on what connections to use for what gasses. For example, an argon cylinder has a "CGA 580" connection on the valve. High purity gases sometimes use CGA-DISS ("Diameter Index Safety System") connections.

Medical gases may use the pin index safety system to prevent incorrect connection of gases to services.

In the European Union, DIN connections are more common than in the United States.

In the UK, the British Standards Institution sets the standards. Included among the standards is the use left-hand threaded valves for flammable gas cylinders (most commonly brass, BS4, valves for non-corrosive cylinder contents or stainless steel, BS15, valves for corrosive contents). Non flammable gas cylinders are fitted with right-hand threaded valves (most commonly brass, BS3, valves for non-corrosive components or stainless steel, BS14, valves for corrosive components).

Regulator 
When the gas in the cylinder is to be used at low pressure, the cap is taken off and a pressure-regulating assembly is attached to the stop valve. This attachment typically has a pressure regulator with upstream (inlet) and downstream (outlet) pressure gauges and a further downstream needle valve and outlet connection. For gases that remain gaseous under ambient storage conditions, the upstream pressure gauge can be used to estimate how much gas is left in the cylinder according to pressure. For gases that are liquid under storage, e.g., propane, the outlet pressure is dependent on the vapor pressure of the gas, and does not fall until the cylinder is nearly exhausted, although it will vary according to the temperature of the cylinder contents. The regulator is adjusted to control the downstream pressure, which will limit the maximum flow of gas out of the cylinder at the pressure shown by the downstream gauge. For some purposes, such as shielding gas for arc welding, the regulator will also have a flowmeter on the downstream side.

The regulator outlet connection is attached to whatever needs the gas supply.

Safety and standards 

Because the contents are under pressure and are sometimes hazardous materials, handling bottled gases is regulated. Regulations may include chaining bottles to prevent falling and damaging the valve, proper ventilation to prevent injury or death in case of leaks and signage to indicate the potential hazards If a compressed gas cylinder tips over, causing the valve block to be sheared off, the rapid release of high-pressure gas may cause the cylinder to be violently accelerated, potentially causing property damage, injury, or death. To prevent this, cylinders are normally secured to a fixed object or transport cart with a strap or chain. They can also be stored in a safety cabinet.

In a fire, the pressure in a gas cylinder rises in direct proportion to its temperature. If the internal pressure exceeds the mechanical limitations of the cylinder and there are no means to safely vent the pressurized gas to the atmosphere, the vessel will fail mechanically. If the vessel contents are flammable, this event may result in a "fireball". Oxidisers such as oxygen and fluorine will produce a similar effect by accelerating combustion in the area affected. If the cylinder's contents are liquid, but become a gas at ambient conditions, this is commonly referred to as a boiling liquid expanding vapour explosion (BLEVE).

Medical gas cylinders in the UK and some other countries have a fusible plug of Wood's metal in the valve block between the valve seat and the cylinder. This plug melts at a comparatively low temperature (70 °C) and allows the contents of the cylinder to escape to the surroundings before the cylinder is significantly weakened by the heat, lessening the risk of explosion.

Gas cylinders found in hot air balloons have to be checked once a year as part of an annual inspection by a CAA approved inspector ensuring no dents or scratches pose a risk to the cylinder. Pressure relief valves on balloon cylinders are replaced after 10 years or sooner if there are signs of damage to them along with an internal inspection of the cylinders to check for corrosion and foreign elements within the cylinder.

More common pressure relief devices are a simple burst disc installed in the base of the valve between the cylinder and the valve seat. A burst disc is a small metal gasket engineered to rupture at a pre-determined pressure. Some burst discs are backed with a low-melting-point metal, so that the valve must be exposed to excessive heat before the burst disc can rupture.

The Compressed Gas Association publishes a number of booklets and pamphlets on safe handling and use of bottled gases.

International and national standards 
There is a wide range of standards relating to the manufacture, use and testing of pressurised gas cylinders and related components. Some examples are listed here.
 ISO 11439: Gas cylinders — High-pressure cylinders for the on-board storage of natural gas as a fuel for automotive vehicles
 ISO 15500-5: Road vehicles — Compressed natural gas (CNG) fuel system components — Part 5: Manual cylinder valve
 US DOT CFR Title 49, part 178, Subpart C — Specification for Cylinders
 US DOT Aluminum Tank Alloy 6351-T6 amendment for SCUBA, SCBA, Oxygen Service — Visual Eddy inspection
 AS 2896-2011:Medical gas systems—Installation and testing of non-flammable medical gas pipeline systems pipeline systems (Australian Standards).

Color coding 
Gas cylinders are often color-coded, but the codes are not standard across different jurisdictions, and sometimes are not regulated. Cylinder color can not safely be used for positive product identification; cylinders have labels to identify the gas they contain.

Common cylinder sizes 
The below are example cylinder sizes and do not constitute an industry standard.

(US DOT specs define material, making, and maximum pressure in psi. They are comparable to Transport Canada specs, which shows pressure in bars. A 3E-1800 in DOT nomenclature would be a TC 3EM 124 in Canada.)

Gas storage tubes 
For larger volume high pressure gas storage units, known as tubes, are available. They generally have a larger diameter and length than high pressure cylinders, and usually have a tapped neck at both ends. They may be mounted alone or in groups on trailers, permanent bases, or intermodal transport frames. Due to their length, they are mounted horizontally on mobile structures. In general usage they are often manifolded together and managed as a unit.

Gas storage banks 

Groups of similar size cylinders may be mounted together and connected to a common manifold system to provide larger storage capacity than a single standard cylinder. This is commonly called a cylinder bank or a gas storage bank. The manifold may be arranged to allow simultaneous flow from all the cylinders, or, for a cascade filling system, where gas is tapped off cylinders according to the lowest positive pressure difference between storage and destination cylinder, being a more efficient use of pressurised gas.

Gas storage quads 

A gas quad is a group of high pressure cylinders mounted on a transport and storage frame. There are commonly 16 cylinders, each of about 50 litres capacity mounted upright in four rows of four, on a square base with a square plan frame with lifting points on top and may have fork-lift slots in the base. The cylinders are usually interconnected as a manifold for use as a unit, but many variations in layout and structure are possible.

See also 

 
 
 
  – Small gas cylinder typically used for specialty gasses
  – a small, inexpensive, disposable metal gas cylinder for providing pneumatic power

References

External links 
 NASA — Safety Standards for Oxygen and Oxygen Handling

Pressure vessels
Anesthetic equipment
Containers
Gas technologies
Industrial gases